Santa Rosa Plaza is one of two enclosed shopping malls in Santa Rosa, California. Opened in 1983, it is anchored by Macy's and Forever 21. The mall is managed by Simon Property Group.

History
The mall was built in downtown Santa Rosa in 1983 with Macy's, Sears, and Mervyn's as the original anchors, following the demolition of various downtown buildings as part of Santa Rosa's urban renewal project, including the landmark 1923 California Theater. Macy's, the first store in the development, opened in 1981 on the site of the former theater. Development was delayed for many years due to legal disputes between developers Ernest Hahn and Hugh Codding, the latter of whom owned nearby Coddingtown Mall. Codding lost the settlement.

In an interview with Gaye LeBaron, Hugh Codding said the construction bonds for the Santa Rosa Plaza were paid in full with property tax revenues from the plaza businesses.

Mervyn's closed in 2008 when the chain filed for bankruptcy. Two years later, the first level of the location became Forever 21.

In 2015, Sears Holdings spun off 235 of its properties, including the Sears at Santa Rosa Plaza, into Seritage Growth Properties.

On October 15, 2018, it was announced that Sears would be closing as part of a plan to close 142 stores nationwide. The store closed on January 6, 2019. The first level is now Home Interiors Furniture.

References

External links
Official website

Buildings and structures in Santa Rosa, California
Shopping malls established in 1983
Shopping malls in the San Francisco Bay Area
Simon Property Group
Economy of Santa Rosa, California